Szamosbecs is a village in Szabolcs-Szatmár-Bereg county, in the Northern Great Plain region of eastern Hungary.

Geography

External links
Aerial photographs

References

Szamosbecs